The Filmfare Best Actress Award is given by the Filmfare magazine as part of its annual Filmfare Awards South for Kannada films (Sandalwood). The awards were extended to "Best Actress" in 1972. The year indicates the year of release of the film.

Superlatives

Winners

Nominations

2008 Radhika Pandit – Moggina Manasu as Chanchala
 Daisy Bopanna – Gaalipata as Soumya
 Pooja Gandhi – Taj Mahal as Shruti
 Ramya – Mussanjemaatu as Tanu
 Suhasi – Haage Summane as Khushi
2009 Radhika Pandit – Love Guru as Kushi
 Haripriya – Kallara Santhe as Roopa 
 Priyamani – Raam as Pooja
 Priyanka Kothari – Raaj The Showman as Parvathy
 Rekha – Parichaya as Nirmala (Nimmi)
2010 Radhika Pandit – Krishnan Love Story as Geetha
 Aindrita Ray – Veera Parampare
 Nayantara – Super as Indira
 Nidhi Subbaiah – Pancharangi as Ambika
 Ramya – Just Math Mathalli as Tanu
2011 Ramya – Sanju Weds Geetha as Geetha
 Deepa Sannidhi – Paramathma as Deepa aka Thithi Vade
 Nidhi Subbaiah – Krishnan Marriage Story as Khushi
 Radhika Pandit – Hudugaru as Gayathri
 Ragini Dwivedi – Kempe Gowda as Kavya
 2012 Priyamani – Chaarulatha
 Pooja Gandhi – Dandupalya
 Pranitha Subhash – Bheema Theeradalli
 Radhika Pandit – Addhuri
 Ramya – Sidlingu
 2013 Amulya – Shravani Subramanya
 Aindrita Ray – Bhajarangi
 Meghana Gaonkar – Charminar
 Nithya Menen – Mynaa 
 Rachita Ram – Bulbul
 Shwetha Srivatsav – Simple Agi Ondh Love Story
 2014 Shwetha Srivatsav – Fair & Lovely
 Haripriya – Ugramm
 Kriti Kharbanda – Super Ranga
 Radhika Pandit – Mr. and Mrs. Ramachari
 Ragini Dwivedi – Ragini IPS
 2015 Parul Yadav – Aatagara
 Mayuri Kyatari – Krishna Leela
 Nabha Natesh – Vajrakaya
 Rachita Ram – Ranna
 Shanvi Srivastava – Masterpiece
 2016 Shraddha Srinath – U Turn
 Hariprriya – Neer Dose
 Parul Yadav – Killing Veerappan
 Shwetha Srivatsav – Kiragoorina Gayyaligalu
 Sruthi Hariharan – Godhi Banna Sadharana Mykattu
 2017 Sruthi Hariharan – Beautiful Manasugalu
 Nivedihta – Shuddhi
 Rashmika Mandanna – Chamak
 Shanvi Srivastava – Tarak
 Shraddha Srinath – Operation Aalamelamma
 2018 Manvitha Kamath – Tagaru
 Ashika Ranganath – Raambo 2
 Meghana Raj – Iruvudellava Bittu 
 Nishvika Naidu -Amma I Love You
 Sruthi Hariharan –  Nathicharami

Notes

References
 
 

Actress
Film awards for lead actress